Michele Pagano may refer to:
 Michele Pagano (painter)
 Michele Pagano (biochemist)